Boris Zilber (born 1949) is a Soviet-British mathematician who works in mathematical logic, specifically model theory. He is a professor of mathematical logic at the University of Oxford.

He obtained his doctorate (Candidate of Sciences) from the Novosibirsk State University in 1975 under the supervision of Mikhail Taitslin and his habilitation (Doctor of Sciences) from the Saint Petersburg State University in 1986.

He received the Senior Berwick Prize (2004) and the Pólya Prize (2015) from the London Mathematical Society. He also gave the Tarski Lectures in 2002.

References

External links
 Prof. Zilber's homepage

20th-century British mathematicians
21st-century British mathematicians
Living people
Academics of the University of Oxford
Model theorists
Soviet mathematicians
Russian mathematicians
Scientists from Tashkent
Novosibirsk State University alumni
1949 births
Fellows of Merton College, Oxford
Tarski lecturers
Gödel Lecturers